Paula Forrest (born 14 July, c. 1965) an Australian actress, best known for playing the role of Shelley Sutherland on the long-running Australian soap opera Home and Away

In Home and Away (1988), Forrest played the part of Shelley who was the wife of Rhys, played by Michael Beckley and mother to Dani, played by Tammin Sursok, Jade, played by Kate Garven and Kirsty, played by Christie Hayes who lived in the Caravan Park and worked as a social worker. Shelley was a loveable character who fought long and hard for her family and friends alike.  Until late 2002 when her world was torn apart by the discovery of her husband's affair and later on in 2003 the fact that Jade was not her real daughter and had in fact been switched at birth. Paula featured in a Home and Away special, called Home and Away: Secrets and the City.

Her character made a brief return to Home and Away in 2009.

Note : Paula Forrest is the patronym of the novel The Little Lady of the Big House, by Jack London (1916).

TV credits
 Home and Away (1988) as Shelley Sutherland (2000–2003, 2004, 2009)
 Home and Away: Hearts Divided (2003) (V) as Shelley Sutherland
 Home and Away: Secrets and the City (2002) (V) as Shelley Sutherland
 Water Rats as Dr. Fiona Hall Jones (1 episode, 1999)
 Murder Call as Susan Frickberge (1 episode, 1997)
 Spellbinder as Ms. Gibson (8 episodes, 1995)
 Day of the Dog (1993) (V) as Policewoman
 Love in Limbo (1993) (V) as Miss Cornish
 Police Rescue as Katie Baldwin (1 episode, 1992)

References

External links

Living people
Australian soap opera actresses
1965 births